The Ankara Football League was founded as a regional football league for Ankara based clubs in 1922. In the period from 1924 to 1935, the winners of the Ankara League qualified for the former Turkish Football Championship. In 1937 the first national league in Turkish football was introduced. The top two placed teams of the Ankara League qualified for the National Division, which took place after the conclusion of the regional leagues each season. After the introduction of professionalism the name of the league became Ankara Professional Football League in the 1955–56 season. 

Following the introduction of the professional nationwide league in 1959, the league lost its first level status. Gençlerbirliği hold the record with ten championship titles.

Participated teams 
The following teams participated in the league regularly for at least a few years: 
 Gençlerbirliği
 Ankara Demirspor
 Ankaragücü (formerly Anadolu Turan San'atkârangücü and İmalât-ı Harbiye)
 Muhafızgücü
 Harp Okulu (formerly Harbiye İdman Yurdu)
 Ankara İdman Yurdu
 Çankaya
 Hacettepe
 Kırıkkalegücü
 Kırıkkale Birlikspor
 Maskespor
 Uçaksavar
 Güneşspor
 Ankara Galatasaray
 Havagücü
 Hilâl
 Yolspor
 Maltepe
 Güvençspor

Champions

Source: 

 1 Due to a conflict among civilian and military clubs, there were two leagues played in the 1954–55 season, one for civilian and one for military clubs. Hacettepe and Karagücü won their respective groups. The official Ankara champions would have been decided in a championship play-off. However, the civilian side refused to play the championship final and there was no official champion declared.

Performance by club

External links
 Ankara League final tables
 Ankara Shield and Ankara Football Cup

References

Sources

Defunct football leagues in Turkey
Sport in Ankara
1922 establishments in the Ottoman Empire
Sports leagues established in 1922
1959 disestablishments in Turkey